A wireless configuration utility, wireless configuration tool,  or  is a class of network management software that manages the activities and features of a wireless network connection. It may control the process of selecting an available access point, authenticating and associating to it and setting up other parameters of the wireless connection.

There are many wireless LAN clients available for use. Clients vary in technical aspects, support of protocols and other factors. Some clients only work with certain hardware devices, while others only on certain operating systems.

Comparison
The table below compares various wireless LAN clients.

See also
 Wireless tools for Linux

References

Wi-Fi
Wireless networking
Wireless LAN client